Hilden Grange  is a coeducational preparatory school in Tonbridge, Kent, England. It caters for children from Nursery to Year 8.

External links
Hilden Grange School website.
Independent Schools Inspectorate report (2002)

Schools in Tonbridge
Girls' schools in Kent
Preparatory schools in Kent